In automotive use, the Stanhope is a car body style characterized by its single bench seat mounted at the center, folding cloth top, and a dashboard at the front. These vehicles were built from approximately 1900 to 1910. The design was derived from the Stanhope horse-drawn carriage and could be considered a specific type of runabout.

Initial Stanhope models featured tiller steering, either in the center or at the side.

Further productions of the Stanhope automobile include three-wheeled versions with fully enclosed body work and a four-wheeled version with front-wheel drive using chains, which also allowed front-wheel steering.

Models
1899–1916 Woods electric car
1899 Winton (largest manufacturer of gasoline-powered automobiles in the United States at the time)
1900–1901 Porter Motor Company (manufacturer of steam-powered automobiles)
1900–1910 White Steamcar (largest manufacturer of steam-powered automobiles)
1901–1907 Oldsmobile Curved Dash
1904–1906 Twyford Stanhope

References

Car body styles